Driftwood Cottage, often simply called Driftwood, is a historic home located on Carmel Point at the southern city limits of Carmel-by-the-Sea, California. It has views of Carmel Bay, Carmel River, and Point Lobos. It was the first house built on Carmel Point and became the home of actress Jean Arthur. Architect George W. Reamer built the house in 1908.

History

The 1906 San Francisco earthquake, left many people homeless including a group of writers and artists who relocated to Carmel-by-the-Sea along with poet George Sterling. This included Florence E. Wells (1864-1966), of Oakland, and her cousin Sara E. Reamer (1842-1910), that bought property in 1906. Sara Reamer was the mother of architect George W. Reamer (1864-1938), who they called “Nannu.”  George Reamer built a house for Wells, as a summer cottage from a sketch she drew on brown paper. It was the first house to go up on Carmel Point at the corner of Scenic Drive and Ocean View Avenue. The property fronted the Carmel River lagoon at a time the Point was without trees and any other homes. 

The  home is set on five lots and has two signle-story buildings made of redwood and stone, a main house and guest cottage, connected by a  hallway. There are four rooms in the main house, open onto an atrium with a glass dome. The floor is covered with blue Japanese slate. A   redwood fence borders the grounds for privacy. Reamer built the home with his signature lava rock fireplace. 

Reamer built a second home on Carmel Point for he and his mother that was across from Wells's cottage. The Wells house was finished first. The area in front of the Wells and Reamer homes was marked on the district charts as "Reamer's Point," and the beach below was called "Reamer's Beach" by those who knew the area at that time.

Robinson Jeffers's family moved into Tor House in August 1919. Tor House fronts Scenic Drive and the Pacific Ocean a few blocks from Driftwood Cottage. 

In 1923, Wells later purchased six acres of the beachfront below her house between Scenic Road and the ocean. The Sanitary District later dropped the suit. In March 1953, Wells sold  of her beach front to the State Park of California under the Beach Acquisition Program.

In 1925, the only homes on Carmel Point were the homes of Col. Fletcher Dutton, poet Robinson Jeffers and his wife Una, Playwright Charles King Van Riper, musician and attorney Edward G. Kuster, George W. Reamer, and Florence Wells.

The Carmel Pine Cone was tracking Wells comings and goings and on July 12, 1929, reported that Wells was visiting her cottage, Driftwood, out on the Point, and that she would be there several weeks. Then, on December 12, 1929, the Pine Cone reported that Wells had returned to her home in Oakland after spending a few weeks at her cottage Driftwood on Carmel Point. 

In June 1938, the Salinas Morning Post, reported that Wells purchased additional lots 22 to 28 on Block B14, and a parcel of land between Scenic Road and the shoreline of the Pacific Ocean. The same lots were reported in The Salinas Californian, on June 12, 1940.

Jean Arthur

Driftwood Cottage became the first Carmel home of actress Jean Arthur (1900–1991) and her mother Johanna Greene. She first rented the house from Wells in 1937, and then bought it after World War II. She remodeled the house and created a large outdoor garden, with landscape artist George Hoy, in a Japanese architecture style. A Japanese bronze dragon latches the weathered redwood gate. Arthur became friends with some of the locals like comic strip cartoonist Gus Arriola and the wife of general Joseph Stilwell who lived a few blocks away on Inspiration Avenue.

In January 1957, Arthur won a public fight to keep her Driftwood property. She even gave a rare public appearance before the State Park Commission in San Francisco to plead her case. The State Park Commission voted to deny a request by the Monterey County to develop a Master Plan for the Carmel Point beachfront and to widen Scenic Road.

Architectural Digest interviewed Arthur in 1976 at her Driftwood home. She expressed how she wanted to incorporate Japanese architecture into the house and garden, and how she used the garden room as an exercise room and as place for house plants. 

Arthur sold the home in 1977 for $435,000 due to financial restrictions. She then purchased Bay Cottage, located at 2313 Bay View, where she lived until her death in 1991.

Florence E. Wells

Florence E. Chapman (1864-1966) was born on September 24, 1864, in Chebanse, Illinois. She was the daughter of Reynolds C. Chapman (1820-1884) and Susan Mckee (1842-1929) of Ireland. Florence move from Illinois to Oakland, California in the 1870s and made her home at 29th and Grove Streets in 1882. Her father built a home on Grove Street. She married Frederick E. Wells (1846-1894) on October 8, 1888 in Oakland. He was an American Civil War veteran who survived the hardship of Confederate Libby Prison to take part in Sherman's March to the Sea. 

Florence and Frederick and no children, but she helped raise her niece, Fay McKee (Chapman) (1887-1971), wife of attorney David Duncan Oliphant (1886-1968), who lived with her up to the time of her death in Oakland. In June 1911, Wells hosted the wedding for her nice that included more than 200 guests, at her residence on Montecito Avenue.

Wells was a member of the First Methodist Church in Oakland, Oakland YWCA, and Daughters of the American Revolution. She was the great granddaughter of Sgt. Constant Chapman (1761-1847) of the Revolutioinary Army. 

She was issued a US passport to travel on October 5, 1899, when she was 42 years old. She was known as "Aunt Florence" to her relatives and friends.

Wells and her cousin, Sara E. Reamer, bought property in 1906, on Carmel Point and architect and cousin George W. Reamer built her home in 1908, as a summer cottage. She traveled between her home in Oakland and her home on the Monterey Peninsula fo 

Wells died on April 28, 1966, at her home, 8 Strathmore Drive, Oakland, at the age of 101. Funeral services were held in Oakland's Gothic Chapel. She was buried at the Mountain View Cemetery in Oakland.

See also
 List of Historic Homes in Carmel Point
 Timeline of Carmel-by-the-Sea, California

References

External links

 Carmel Point Walking Tour

1908 establishments in California
Carmel-by-the-Sea, California
Buildings and structures in Monterey County, California